Bhogenagarkoppa is a village in Dharwad district of Karnataka, India.

Demographics
As of the 2011 Census of India there were 520 households in Bhogenagarkoppa and a total population of 2,419 consisting of 1,253 males and 1,166 females. There were 333 children ages 0-6.

References

Villages in Dharwad district